Anna Henriette "Jette" Pauss (2 April 1841, at Frogner Manor in Aker (now Frogner, Oslo) – 4 April 1918, in Christiania), née Anna Henriette Wegner, was a Norwegian teacher, editor and humanitarian and missionary leader.

With her husband Bernhard Pauss, she was one of the early leaders of the Norwegian Santal Mission, a humanitarian and missionary organisation that was active among the Santhal people of India. In 1907, she succeeded her husband as editor of the organisation's journal Santalen ("The Santal") and also became a member of its executive board, as the first woman elected to the national leadership of a Norwegian missionary organization. She was a teacher at the private Nissen's Girls' School, which was owned by her husband, and was the school's headmistress from 1885 to 1909. She was also a member of the board of directors of the School for Young Ladies in Christian Augusts Gade. Together with e.g. Moltke Moe, Erik Werenskiold, Gina Krog, Axel Johannessen, Erika Nissen and Bjørnstjerne Bjørnson, she was among the co-authors of the book Forældre og Børn, edited by Aksel Arstal (1902).

She was the youngest daughter of the industrialist and estate owner Benjamin Wegner and Henriette Seyler, and was a granddaughter of the Hamburg banker L.E. Seyler and Anna Henriette Gossler, for whom she was named. Her mother's family owned Berenberg Bank. Her great-grandfather was the Swiss theatre director Abel Seyler. With her siblings, she was one of the heirs to the Hafslund estate, Frognerseteren and the timber firm Juel, Wegner & Co. She was a goddaughter of Countess Karen Wedel-Jarlsberg, Prime Minister Nicolai Johan Lohmann Krog, President of the Parliament Søren Anton Wilhelm Sørenssen, banker Johannes Thomassen Heftye, Prime Minister Frederik Stang, the King's aide-de-camp Hans Christian Rosen, Marie Schjøtt and Henriette Benedicte Løvenskiold. In 1864, she and her siblings sold Frognerseteren to her godbrother Thomas Johannessen Heftye.

In her youth, she was among the key participants in Hans Faye's 1859 masquerade ball with Louis XIV and Louis XV era costumes in Gamle Logen, one of the highlights of Christiania high society in the 19th century.

She had five children, among them the surgeon Nikolai Nissen Paus, the lawyer George Wegner Paus and the hydropower executive Augustin Paus.

She is interred at Vår Frelsers gravlund.

Ancestry

References

1841 births
1918 deaths
Burials at the Cemetery of Our Saviour
Schoolteachers from Oslo
Norwegian people of German descent
Norwegian writers